Inkberrow Castle was situated in the village of Inkberrow in Worcestershire, some 10 km south of Redditch.

It was a castle built between 1154 and 1216 which was destroyed (slighted) in 1233.  A moat remains which may be that of the castle or of a later manor house built on or near the site of the castle.  Earthworks are also present.

References
Inkberrow Castle 1
Fry, Plantagenet Somerset, The David & Charles Book of Castles, David & Charles, 1980. 

Castles in Worcestershire